Panegyrtes is a genus of longhorn beetles of the subfamily Lamiinae, containing the following species:

 Panegyrtes apicale Martins & Galileo, 2005
 Panegyrtes basale Galileo & Martins, 1995
 Panegyrtes bifasciatus Breuning, 1940
 Panegyrtes clarkei Galileo & Martins, 2007
 Panegyrtes crinitus Galileo & Martins, 1995
 Panegyrtes davidsoni Martins & Galileo, 1998
 Panegyrtes delicatus Galileo & Martins, 1995
 Panegyrtes fasciatus Galileo & Martins, 1995
 Panegyrtes fraternus Galileo & Martins, 1995
 Panegyrtes lactescens Thomson, 1868
 Panegyrtes maculatissimus Galileo & Martins, 1995
 Panegyrtes porosus Galileo & Martins, 1993
 Panegyrtes pseudolactescens Breuning, 1974
 Panegyrtes scutellatus Galileo & Martins, 1995
 Panegyrtes sparsepunctatus Breuning, 1940
 Panegyrtes striatopunctatus Breuning, 1940
 Panegyrtes varicornis Breuning, 1940

References

Desmiphorini